No. 5 Squadron  (Tuskers) is a fighter squadron and is equipped with Jaguar IS and based at Ambala Air Force Station under the Western Air Command.

History
The squadron has retained – and discharged – a primarily offensive operational role for the Indian Air Force, in the half-century since its inception in 1948.
It also participated in the Congo Crisis, supporting UN peacekeeping troops

Aircraft

References 

005
1948 establishments in India